The Chtaura Park Hotel is a five-star hotel in Bekaa, Lebanon. The hotel lies in the Bekaa Valley between two mountain ranges at an altitude of 950 metres and half an hour's drive from Damascus across the border in Syria.

The hotel has a number of restaurants including Le Diplomat, which offers European cuisine, while Al Dawali serves Lebanese cuisine.

In 2008 renovation work began on the hotel and it was scheduled to be reopened in May 2009.

External links
Chtaura Hotel website

Hotels in Lebanon
Hotels established in 1958
Hotel buildings completed in 1958
1958 establishments in Lebanon